Liebfraumilch or Liebfrauenmilch (in reference to the Virgin Mary) is a style of semi-sweet white German wine which may be produced, mostly for export, in the regions Rheinhessen, Palatinate, Rheingau, and Nahe. The original German spelling of the word is Liebfrauenmilch, given to the wine produced from the vineyards of the Liebfrauenkirche or "Church of Our Lady" in the Rhineland-Palatinate city of Worms since the eighteenth century. The spelling Liebfraumilch is more common on labels of exported wine.

Classification
The generic label Liebfraumilch is typically used to market vintages from anywhere in most of the major wine growing areas of Germany, the notable exception being Mosel. Wine with very similar characteristics but made from higher quality grapes can be labeled as Spätlese or Auslese. In the US and the UK, perhaps the best known example has been Blue Nun, which no longer uses the Liebfraumilch designation.

The term Liebfraumilch is associated with low quality wine, and, consequently, the German wine classification requires it only to be at the Qualitätswein bestimmter Anbaugebiete (QbA) level—the third rank out of ten. However, it must also be from Rheinhessen, Pfalz, Nahe, or Rheingau, and the grapes must be at least 70% Riesling, Silvaner, or Müller-Thurgau, and it must have  residual sugar.

German wine is classified roughly into ten categories:
Tafelwein (dining wine), Landwein, QbA (as mentioned above), followed by QbP (with predicate), followed by Kabinett, Spätlese (late harvest), Auslese (special selection), Beerenauslese (lit. berry selection), and Trockenbeerenauslese (dry berry selection). Somewhat apart sits the Eiswein (ice wine), which is generally understood to be at least on par with the Beerenauslese, but helped with both Botryitis (as is the Beerenauslese) in conjunction with natural cryo extraction (icewine grapes have to be processed at -7 °C). Overall, these quality levels are following extract per litre measures (density levels) as these are indicative of sugar levels. Blue Nun, as a result, sits at level 1 out of 8 and, despite its international success, is rarely considered in the domestic market.

In popular culture
When a rack of wine topples over in the 1932 Hollywood film Downstairs, the wine cellar caretaker Otto (Otto Hoffman) laments a broken bottle of Liebfrauenmilch, very likely to be a subtle joke.

In the book Desert Solitaire, by Edward Abbey, the author stops at a liquor store to purchase a bottle of liebfraumilch on his way to  Mount Tukuhnikivatz.

In the episode of Only Fools and Horses, "Dates", Del Boy mentions to the matchmaker that he would like a "refined" woman that can tell the difference between "Liebfraumilch and a can of Tizer".

References

External links
 Valckenberg company history

German wine
German words and phrases